The 1976 Buckeye Tennis Championships was a men's tennis tournament played on outdoor hard courts at the Buckeye Boys Ranch in Grove City, Columbus, Ohio in the United States that was part of Two Star category of the 1976 Grand Prix circuit. It was the seventh edition of the tournament and was held  from August 2 through August 8, 1976. First-seeded Roscoe Tanner won the singles title and earned $16,000 first-prize money.

Finals

Singles
 Roscoe Tanner defeated  Stan Smith 6–4, 7–6(7–5)
 It was Tanner's 2nd singles title of the year and 6th of his career.

Doubles
 William Brown /  Brian Teacher defeated  Fred McNair /  Sherwood Stewart 6–3, 6–4

References

External links
 ITF tournament edition details

Buckeye Tennis Championships
Buckeye Tennis Championships
Buckeye Tennis Championships
Buckeye Tennis Championships